Ankit Arora is an Indian television actor. He is best known for playing Lakshman on Ramayan and Rukn'ud'din on Razia Sultan. He Played The adult Version of Yuvraj Shushim Maurya in Chakravartin Ashoka Samrat.

Television

Film

Dubbing roles

References

External links

Living people
Indian male soap opera actors
Indian male television actors
Year of birth missing (living people)